Ravine d'Ango is a village on the island of Réunion, located on its southeastern coast. It depends on the commune of Saint-Philippe.

Populated places in Réunion